WOW counties is a common media term in southeastern Wisconsin in the United States which refers to the initials of Waukesha, Ozaukee, and Washington counties. They lie to the west, north, and northwest of Milwaukee, respectively, and are part of the Milwaukee metropolitan area. Collectively, the three counties have a population of 635,242 as of 2020. Like the collar counties surrounding Chicago, these counties have a primarily white population, and unusually so considering the trend of suburbs around cities in the Rust Belt region becoming more racially diverse. Racine County, to the south of Milwaukee County, has similar demographics outside the city of Racine (though some communities have lower average income), but is usually not included due to the city of Racine's population being just under 69% of the county's population.

Historically, the WOW counties were among the most Republican areas in the state. However, with the GOP's increasing trend toward right-wing populism under Donald Trump, several rural areas of Wisconsin have become significantly more Republican than the WOW counties in most races, including the non-partisan Superintendent of Public Instruction (where pro-school choice and voucher candidates who support traditional pedagogy are preferred). While the WOW counties remain solidly Republican, the party’s landslides have diminished somewhat in the Trump era, shrinking from 2 to 1 in 2012, to 3 to 2 in 2020.

All county offices are held by Republicans; indeed, there are almost no elected Democrats above the county level. None of the counties have supported a Democrat for president since Lyndon Johnson's national landslide of 1964. In 2008, while Barack Obama carried Wisconsin by 14 points and won 59 out of 72 counties, the three counties were his weakest and the only ones in the state where he won less than 40 percent of the county's vote. The vast majority of the state party's voter turnout efforts (along with those of outside organizations) were, for many years, focused on maximizing turnout from those three counties to counteract the turnout from Milwaukee and Dane counties (home to Milwaukee and Madison) and the cities of Racine and Kenosha, which generally lean Democratic. However, with the recent Republican trend in rural Wisconsin, GOP turnout efforts have become focused on maximizing rural turnout at the expense of turnout in Milwaukee, Madison, Racine and Kenosha as well as the growing Democratic turnout in the WOW counties. This was a factor in Trump’s 2016 upset win in Wisconsin, a feat Trump could not replicate in 2020. Local conservative talk radio stations such as WISN (1130) and the late morning and midday shows of WTMJ (620) have long targeted their programs' topics and talking points more to the WOW counties rather than their city of license, Milwaukee.

Election history
The Wow counties as a collective have voted for 20 of the 21 most recent Republican presidential campaigns, and in the most recent election that the Democratic Party took the region, Barry Goldwater lost by about 6.5% in an election where he lost Wisconsin by a margin of roughly 24.3%.

References

Politics of Wisconsin